Matthew Balunas (7 January 1918 – 1 February 2006) was a Scottish footballer who played as a right back.

A member of North Lanarkshire's  Lithuanian immigrant community, Balunas spent almost his entire senior career (which only began in his mid 20s due to World War II) with Third Lanark, winning two Glasgow Merchants Charity Cups and featuring on the losing side in four Glasgow Cup finals. He was considered to be a reliable, uncomplicated and defensive-minded player.

References

1918 births
2006 deaths
Footballers from North Lanarkshire
Association football defenders
Scottish footballers
Scottish people of Lithuanian descent
Third Lanark A.C. players
Stranraer F.C. players
Scottish Junior Football Association players
Scottish Football League players